Chebet Lesan (born c. 1990) is a Kenyan entrepreneur who has received various awards by creating charcoal briquettes from waste material and then selling it on to a network of women. The resulting product creates affordable fuel in Kenya and avoids trees from being used and its smoke free burn gives health benefits. The awards include the Queen's Young Leader Award and a Mandela Washington Fellowship for Young African Leaders.

Life
Lesan was born in about 1990 and she attended the University of Nairobi where she graduated in Industrial Design.

Lesan is a Mandela Washington Fellow. She says that she was inspired to her idea by seeing the loss of trees around Mount Kilimanjaro. She decided that she could make charcoal briquettes from biomass. Waste can come from sawdust or discarded flour. The waste material is carbonised and then the material, called char, is then pressed into briquettes with three different densities and heat output. The company she founded is called BrightGreen. Irrespective of their density they are sold by weight where they are targeted at normal consumers. Many consumers are living on $4 a day so the approximate charge of $0.55 per kilo is affordable. In 2017 they had supplied 300 households in total with 100 tons of briquettes. Demand is high as Kenya has used up 98% of their indigenous forest and this means that fuel for cooking can cost $25 for a 35 kg bag.

Her invention was estimated to have saved 800 tons of trees in Kenya by the end of 2017. Moreover, the briquettes burn with no smoke meaning that they are less harmful than the smoke filled hut she remembered her grandmother had to cook in.

Lesan chooses to distribute her fuel via women entrepreneurs who sell on the product. In 2019 the company was moving into profit but funds from competing in business costests like the CartierWomen's Initiative were targeted at extending the company's distribution area further.

Awards
 Queen's Young Leader Award in 2017
 Mandela Washington Fellowship for Young African Leaders 
 2017 Scale-Up Fellow at MIT
 Cartier Women's Initiative 2019 finalist

References

1990s births
Living people
21st-century Kenyan businesswomen
21st-century Kenyan businesspeople
University of Nairobi alumni